Yan Ying is one of the 29 constituencies in the Sai Kung District.

The constituency returns one district councillor to the Sai Kung District Council, with an election every four years.

Yan Ying constituency is loosely based on Yan Ming Court, Metro City 2 and part of Po Lam Estate in Tseung Kwan O with estimated population of 18,246.

Councillors represented

Election results

2010s

2000s

1990s

Notes

References

Tseung Kwan O
Constituencies of Hong Kong
Constituencies of Sai Kung District Council
1994 establishments in Hong Kong
Constituencies established in 1994